Western Norway Film Commission (WNFC) was the first regional film commission in Norway, established in 2003. WNFC is supported by the counties of Møre og Romsdal and Vestland and provides free services to international film and TV productions considering filming in Western Norway. WNFC is a member of Association of Film Commissioners International, European Film Commission Network and Nordic Film Commissions.

Feature films and drama series shot on location in Western Norway includes Dune, No Time to Die, Black Widow, Ragnarok, Mission: Impossible - Fallout, The Innocents, Quo Vado? and Star Wars: The Empire Strikes Back.

WNFC has its offices in the city of Bergen and Ålesund.

External links
Western Norway Film Commission

Film commissions
2003 establishments in Norway
Organizations established in 2003
Film organisations in Norway